Gagamboy is a 2004 Filipino superhero comedy film directed by Erik Matti and starring Vhong Navarro. It is similar to the Spider-Man films, with a mutated spider that causes Gagamboy to gain his superpowers.

Plot
Junie (Navarro), is an ice cream vendor, who sells ice cream to children and adults alike. After his shift, he is in a predicament with a rival vendor, Dodoy (Jay Manalo). Their manager, angered by their actions, demotes Junie to a warehouse guard. Dodoy celebrates, only to be demoted too, working a different shift to Junie. Junie goes home in a bad mood, until he sees the love of his life, Liana (Aubrey Miles). After dinner, Junie is ready to sleep, to start a new job the next day. While working, Junie accidentally swallows a spider which has been exposed to a chemical spill, thus giving him web slinging abilities, and becoming "Gagamboy"(Spiderboy). After his shift, Dodoy comes in to work and leaves a sandwich unprotected. A cockroach exposed to the same spill as the spider slips into his sandwich, and as he eats it, he collapses, only to regain consciousness as a large cockroach. He hires two henchmen, and calls himself "Ipisman" (Cockroachman). Junie and Dodoy both try to win Liana's love. Dodoy practically gives up, only to return as Cockroachman, to kidnap Liana to lure Spiderboy to his lair. There, he plans to finish off Spiderboy, but the tables turn and Dodoy is destroyed.

Cast
 Vhong Navarro as Junie/Spiderboy/Gagamboy
 Jay Manalo as Dodoy/Cockroachman/Ipisman
 Aubrey Miles as  Liana 
 Long Mejia as Barangay Captain   
 Bearwin Meily as Assistant Barangay Captain  
 Rene Boy "Ate Glow" Facunla as  Gloring
 Mon Confiado as Snatcher

Release
The film was shown at the 2004 Hong Kong International Film Festival.

Critical reception 
Despite its low production qualities, the film received general praise due to its use of humor, especially in parodying other tokusatsu and superhero films. As a result, the film is well known in the Chinese kuso community.

Box office
The film opened on January 1, 2004, as a part of the 2003 Metro Manila Film Festival. The film opened seventh in the box office, earning 18 million in its first week, and eventually earning 27 million in its theatrical run.

References

External links
 

2004 films
Philippine science fiction action films
Philippine science fantasy films
Philippine comedy films
2004 science fiction films
Regal Entertainment films
Films directed by Erik Matti